Bình Thuận may refer to several places in Vietnam, including:

Bình Thuận Province
Bình Thuận, District 7, a ward of District 7, Ho Chi Minh City
Bình Thuận, Đà Nẵng, a ward of Hải Châu District
Bình Thuận, Đắk Lắk, a commune of Buôn Hồ
Bình Thuận, Quảng Ngãi, a commune of Bình Sơn District
Bình Thuận, Thái Nguyên, a commune of Đại Từ District
Bình Thuận, Bình Định, a commune of Tây Sơn District
Bình Thuận, Yên Bái, a commune of Văn Chấn District